Originally built as  light cruisers (CL) in the United States Navy during World War II, in 1957 three ships were re-designated as Providence-class guided missile light cruisers (CLG) and fitted with the Terrier surface-to-air missile system.  During the two year refit under project SCB 146, the aft superstructure was completely replaced and all aft guns were removed to make room for the twin-arm Terrier launcher and a 120 missile storage magazine.  Three large masts were also installed in order to hold a variety of radars, missile guidance, and communications systems.  Providence and Springfield were simultaneously converted into fleet flagships under SCB 146A, which involved removing two forward dual  and one triple  turrets, and replacing them with a massively rebuilt and expanded forward superstructure.  Topeka, in the non-flagship configuration, retained the Cleveland-class's standard forward weapons: three dual  and two triple  turrets.

Little Rock and Oklahoma City were outfitted as fleet flagships, but Galveston was not.

Like the Galveston class cruisers, the Providence class ships suffered from serious stability problems caused by the topweight of the missile system, requiring the use of ballast to improve stability. The cruisers also suffered from hogging of the hull.

All three Providence-class ships were decommissioned to the reserve fleet between 1969 and 1974.  In the 1975 cruiser realignment, Providence and Springfield were reclassified as guided missile cruisers (CG).  The ships were stricken from the Naval Vessel Register between 1974 and 1980, and eventually sold for scrap.

Ships in class

See also 
 List of cruisers of the United States Navy

References

External links 

hazegray.org
US Naval Historical Center

Cruiser classes
 
Light cruisers of the United States Navy